Route 50 is a  road that stretches from Route 56 at the junction of Rice Street in Lihue to a point approximately 1/5 mile north of the northernmost entrance of the Pacific Missile Range Facility on the western shore of Kauai. It is the longest numbered road on the island of Kauai and is named Kaumualii Highway.

Route description 

Hawaii Route 50 begins in Lihue and heads west.  The road passes through the only major shopping center on the island at the intersection with Route 58.  From there, the road passes through the countryside and several small communities.  There are numerous agricultural farms and plantations set up along the route. The National Historic Landmark known as Russian Fort Elizabeth is located where the highway crosses the Waimea River.

The last major sugarcane plantation on Kauai is along the route west of Waimea.  West of Waimea, Route 50 serves only as an access road to 4 major sites: Pacific Missile Range Facility, Polihale Beach, Kekaha Town, and Waimea Canyon via Route 550. The only public services available west of Waimea are a collection of tourist shops and a convenience store at the base of Route 550.
Route 50 is named after Kaumualii, the last king of the island of Kauai.

Major intersections

References

External links

Transportation in Kauai County, Hawaii
0050